Sean O'Grady is a paralympic athlete from Ireland competing mainly in category F55 shot put and discus events.

O'Grady competed at four Paralympics: 1988, 1992, 1996 and 2000.  In each games he competed in one or more of the shot put and discus events.  His only medal came in the F54 discus in the 1996 games, where he won a bronze medal.

References

Paralympic athletes of Ireland
Athletes (track and field) at the 1988 Summer Paralympics
Athletes (track and field) at the 1992 Summer Paralympics
Athletes (track and field) at the 1996 Summer Paralympics
Athletes (track and field) at the 2000 Summer Paralympics
Paralympic bronze medalists for Ireland
Living people
Medalists at the 1996 Summer Paralympics
Year of birth missing (living people)
Paralympic medalists in athletics (track and field)
Irish male discus throwers
Irish male shot putters
Wheelchair discus throwers
Wheelchair shot putters
Paralympic discus throwers
Paralympic shot putters